The 2012 ITS Cup Doubles was a professional tennis tournament played on outdoor clay courts in Olomouc, Czech Republic.

Michaëlla Krajicek and Renata Voráčová were the defending champions, but Krajicek chose not to participate. Therefore, Voráčová partnered up with Yuliya Beygelzimer, but lost in the final to Inés Ferrer Suárez and Richèl Hogenkamp 2–6, 6–7(4–7).

Seeds

Draw

Draw

References
 Main Draw

ITS Cup - Doubles
ITS Cup